The Georgia Tech Yellow Jackets college football team represents the Georgia Institute of Technology in the Coastal Division of the Atlantic Coast Conference (ACC). The Yellow Jackets compete as part of the National Collegiate Athletic Association (NCAA) Division I Football Bowl Subdivision. The school has had 21 official head coaches and 3 interim head coaches since first fielding a team in 1892. Brent Key is the current head coach for the team, taking over after Geoff Collins was fired midway through the 2022 season.

The team has played in over 1,300 games over 129 seasons. In that time, 10 official and 2 interim head coaches have overseen teams that have competed in postseason bowl games: William Alexander, Bobby Dodd, Bud Carson, Bill Fulcher, Pepper Rodgers, Bill Curry, Bobby Ross, George O'Leary, Mac McWhorter (interim), Chan Gailey, Jon Tenuta (interim), and Paul Johnson. Six coaches have also won a conference championship: John Heisman won three Southern Intercollegiate Athletic Association (SIAA) championships, Alexander won two SIAA, three Southern Conference, and three Southeastern Conference (SEC) championships, Dodd won two SEC championships, and Ross, O'Leary, and Johnson all have one ACC championship. During their tenures, Heisman, Alexander, Dodd, and Ross each won a national championship with the Yellow Jackets.

Alexander holds the record for the longest tenure of any Georgia Tech coach, serving in that role for 244 games over 25 seasons. Cyrus W. Strickler has the highest winning percentage among full-time coaches, with a record of 4–0–1 (.900). If interim coaches were counted, McWhorter holds the highest percentage, with a record of 1–0 (1.000). Ernest E. West, Rufus B. Nalley, Harris T. Collier, and Tenuta had no wins during their career at Georgia Tech, with Collier holding the record for most losses without a win at 9. Four coaches (Heisman, Alexander, Dodd, and Johnson) have been inducted into the College Football Hall of Fame.

Key

Coaches

Notes

References

Sources

General

Specific 

 
 
 
 
 
 
 
 
 
 
 

Georgia Tech

Georgia (U.S. state) sports-related lists